Hakimabad (also Romanized as Ḩakīmābād and Hakīmābād) is a village in Hakimabad Rural District, in the Central District of Zarandieh County, Markazi Province, Iran. At the 2006 census, its population was 1,228, in 319 families.

References 

Populated places in Zarandieh County